In graph theory, the Holt graph or Doyle graph is the smallest half-transitive graph, that is, the smallest example of a vertex-transitive and edge-transitive graph which is not also symmetric. Such graphs are not common.  It is named after Peter G. Doyle and Derek F. Holt, who discovered the same graph independently in 1976 and 1981 respectively.

The Holt graph has diameter 3, radius 3 and girth 5, chromatic number 3, chromatic index 5 and is Hamiltonian with  distinct Hamiltonian cycles. It is also a 4-vertex-connected and a 4-edge-connected graph. It has book thickness 3 and queue number 3.

It has an automorphism group of order 54. This is a smaller group than a symmetric graph with the same number of vertices and edges would have. The graph drawing on the right highlights this, in that it lacks reflectional symmetry.

The characteristic polynomial of the Holt graph is

Gallery

References 

Individual graphs
Regular graphs